The Park Hotel is a seven-story hotel in downtown Hot Springs, Arkansas near Bathhouse Row within Hot Springs National Park. Built in 1930 by Thompson, Sanders and Ginocchio in the Spanish Revival style, the hotel was added to the National Register of Historic Places in 1982. , the building is still operated as a hotel.

Architecture
The rectangular, seven-story building features restrained Spanish Revival architecture details. A cut stone entrance wing projects toward the street, leading to a double-leaf brass door flanked by casement windows. An ornamented parapet features a shield and foliate design with the hotel's name also detailed. A porch wraps around the hotel's entrances.

History
The Park Hotel was built during a period of growth in Hot Springs, including several other buildings designed by the same firm. The Riviera Hotel and Wade Clinic, as well as several residential structures and churches were built during this period.

President Harry Truman was known to frequent the hotel, preferring room 401, a corner room with a view of the Hot Springs Grand Promenade.

See also

National Register of Historic Places listings in Garland County, Arkansas

References

National Register of Historic Places in Hot Springs, Arkansas
Mission Revival architecture in Arkansas
Hotel buildings completed in 1930
Buildings and structures in Hot Springs, Arkansas
Hotels in Arkansas
1930 establishments in Arkansas